Ryan Dingle is an American ice hockey coach and former professional center. He won a National Championships with Denver in 2005.

Career
Dingle played three seasons of junior hockey in the USHL. Though he was limited to just 38 games in 2004, he averaged nearly a point per game while helping the Tri-City Storm win a regular season title and march all the way to the Clark Cup finals. The following season, he joined the ice hockey team at Denver and provided depth scoring while the team repeated as national champions. Dingle adjusted to the college game in his sophomore year and finished third in team scoring behind future NHL all-stars Paul Stastny and Matt Carle. He had a slight regression as a junior but generated enough interest to sign a professional contract after the season.

For his first full year as a professional, Dingle spent most of his time in the ECHL. He did receive a brief callup to the Portland Pirates but it wasn't until the Anaheim Ducks changed their affiliation to the Iowa Chops that he became an AHL regular. Dingle spent two full seasons playing AAA-hockey but he never managed to find his scoring touch. After dropping back down to the ECHL he had a rather poor outing with the Victoria Salmon Kings and then headed to Europe to continue his career.

In 2011, Dingle signed on with SG Cortina and immediately became one of the team's top scorers. He led the club with 21 goals (tied) and continued to anchor the top line for four years. After the club missed the postseason in 2015, Dingle headed to Scotland and played two years for the Fife Flyers. He finished second on the team in scoring in both years and served as team captain in 2017. After leaving the Flyers, Dingle played one more year in Britain before retiring as a player.

With his playing days over, Dingle returned to Steamboat Springs and became the head coach for the Steamboat Wranglers, a local junior team. Though he kept the job for only one season, he remained with the club as a player development coach while also acting as a Director of youth hockey for Steamboat Springs.

Career statistics

Regular season and playoffs

Awards and honors

References

External links

1984 births
Living people
American men's ice hockey centers
Ice hockey people from Colorado
People from Steamboat Springs, Colorado
Des Moines Buccaneers players
Tri-City Storm players
Denver Pioneers men's ice hockey players
NCAA men's ice hockey national champions
Portland Pirates players
Augusta Lynx players
Iowa Stars players
Adirondack Phantoms players
Victoria Salmon Kings players
SG Cortina players
Fife Flyers players
Coventry Blaze players
American expatriate ice hockey players in Scotland
American expatriate ice hockey players in England
American expatriate ice hockey players in Canada
American expatriate ice hockey players in Italy